Urzhum is the name of several inhabited localities in Russia.

Urban localities
Urzhum, Urzhumsky District, Kirov Oblast, a town in Urzhumsky District of Kirov Oblast; 

Rural localities
Urzhum, Altai Krai, a selo in Dubrovsky Selsoviet of Aleysky District in Altai Krai; 
Urzhum, Sanchursky District, Kirov Oblast, a village in Korlyakovsky Rural Okrug of Sanchursky District in Kirov Oblast; 
Urzhum, Kostroma Oblast, a village in Kotkishevskoye Settlement of Neysky District in Kostroma Oblast;